Los viciosos ("The Vicious") is an Argentine black-and-white thriller film directed by Enrique Carreras and adapted from a screenplay by Sixto Pondal Ríos. The film was released on October 25, 1962 and starred Graciela Borges, Jorge Salcedo, Eduardo Cuitiño, Myriam de Urquijo and Coccinelle.

Synopsis 
Police investigate a drug trafficking ring.

Cast 
 Graciela Borges 
 Jorge Salcedo
 Eduardo Cuitiño
 Myriam de Urquijo  
 Inés Moreno
 Jorge Acuña
 Héctor Gancé 
 Coccinelle
 Irma Roy 
 Rodolfo Onetto 
 Lalo Hartich
 Alberto Barcel
 Enrique Carreras

References

External links

Argentine thriller films
Argentine cinema articles needing an image
1960s thriller films
Films directed by Enrique Carreras
1962 films